Roy Yamaguchi Memorial Trophy is the sailing trophy awarded at the Women's Snipe World Championships. The Roy Yamaguchi Memorial Trophy is awarded to the winning skipper and her crew. Another trophy, the Carmen Diaz Trophy, donated by Augie Diaz, is awarded to the highest placing Junior Women's team at the Women's World Championship.

This competition is held every two years in the even numbered years since 1994.

The Roy Yamaguchi Memorial Trophy was donated to the SCIRA by Japan.

Winners

References

External links 
SCIRA

Snipe World Championships
Women's world sailing championships